Roposo is an Indian video-sharing social media service, owned by Glance, a subsidiary of InMobi. Roposo provides a space where users can share posts related to different topics like food, comedy, music, poetry, fashion and travel. It is a platform where people express visually with homemade videos and photos. The app offers a TV-like browsing experience with user-generated content on its channels. Users can also use editing tools on the platform and upload their content.

History  
Established in July 2014, under the aegis of Relevant E-solutions Pvt. Ltd., Roposo is the brainchild of three IIT Delhi alumni – Mayank Bhangadia, Avinash Saxena and Kaushal Shubhank. 

In November 2019, Roposo was acquired by InMobi's Glance Digital Experience Pvt. Ltd.(the mobile content platform and part of the InMobi Group). When the Chinese-owned video-sharing app Tiktok was banned on 30 June 2020, the app saw a huge spike in users with several TikTok users registering on Roposo.

Technology 
The open platform has some features such as a TV-like browsing, different channels, a chat feature that lets buyers and sellers converse directly through the platform, and creation tools such as an option to add voice-over, music and GIF stickers for videos and photos.

References

External links 
 Official website

Social networking services
Indian entertainment websites
Privately held companies of India
2014 establishments in Karnataka
Mobile applications
2019 mergers and acquisitions